Bondefangeri i Vaterland (Con Job in Vaterland) is a Norwegian silent film from 1911 that is considered lost. The film portrayed prostitutes and beggars in Oslo's Vaterland neighborhood. The film premiered at the Kosmorama Theater in Kristiania (now Oslo) on November 11, 1911.

Cast
 Pehr Qværnstrøm as the farmer
 Signe Danning as the White Rose
 Hans Ingi Hedemark as Ola Snippen
 Christian Nobel as Kal' Røver'n
 Mathea Tønder as the farmer's wife
 Emmy Worm-Müller as Agurka

References

External links
 
 Bondefangeri i Vaterland at Norsk filmografi

1911 films
Norwegian drama films
Norwegian black-and-white films
Norwegian silent films
Lost Norwegian films
Silent drama films